Alexei Anatolyevich Medvedev (born January 13, 1982) is a Russian professional ice hockey forward  who currently plays for Severstal Cherepovets of the Kontinental Hockey League (KHL).

References

External links

Living people
Salavat Yulaev Ufa players
1982 births
Russian ice hockey forwards